The PFL 2 mixed martial arts event for the 2022 season of the Professional Fighters League was held on April 28, 2022, at the Esports Stadium Arlington in Arlington, Texas. This was the second regular season event of the tournament and included fights in the Heavyweight and Featherweight divisions.

Background 
The event was headlined by a heavyweight bout between the 2021 champion Bruno Cappelozza and UK regional veteran Stuart Austin. The co-main featured a featherweight bout between Brendan Loughnane and Shooto veteran Ryoji Kudo.

The remaining two fights of the main card saw heavyweight finalist Ante Delija face off against Matheus Scheffel, while the Renan Ferreira faced off against Jamelle Jones.

Bubba Jenkins was scheduled to face Sung Bin Jo at this event. However, after Jo Sungbin pulled out of the bout, he was replaced by Kyle Bochniak.

A heavyweight bout between Ali Isaev and Klidson Abreu was scheduled for the event. However, Isaev pulled out of the bout and was replaced by the Week 6 winner of the PFL Challenger Series, Adam Keresh.

A heavyweight bout between Denis Goltsov and Sam Kei was scheduled for this event. However, Kei would later pull out of the bout and was replaced by Cody Goodale.

Results

Standings After Event 
The PFL points system is based on results of the match.  The winner of a fight receives 3 points.  If the fight ends in a draw, both fighters will receive 1 point. The bonus for winning a fight in the first, second, or third round is 3 points, 2 points, and 1 point respectively. The bonus for winning in the third round requires a fight be stopped before 4:59 of the third round.  No bonus point will be awarded if a fighter wins via decision.  For example, if a fighter wins a fight in the first round, then the fighter will receive 6 total points. A decision win will result in three total points.  If a fighter misses weight, the opponent (should they comply with weight limits) will receive 3 points due to a walkover victory, regardless of winning or losing the bout;  if the non-offending fighter subsequently wins with a stoppage, all bonus points will be awarded.

Heavyweight

Featherweight

See also 

 List of PFL events
 List of current PFL fighters

References 

Professional Fighters League
2022 in mixed martial arts
April 2022 sports events in the United States
Events in Arlington, Texas